The following highways are/were numbered 931:

Costa Rica
 National Route 931

Ireland
 R931 regional road

United States